The Federal Office of Public Health (FOPH) is the Swiss federal government’s centre for public health and a part of the Swiss Federal Department of Home Affairs.

In addition to developing national health policy, it also represents the interests of its country within international health organizations such as the OECD or the World Health Organization. As of December 2014, FOPH employs 544 persons (443 full-time job equivalents). The 2015 budget was 193 million Swiss francs.

Directorates, divisions and units 
The Federal Office of Public Health is headed by its director Anne Lévy. The organisation is as follows:
 Health and Accident Insurance Directorate:
 Health Care Services Division
 Insurance Supervision Division
 Health Policy Directorate
 Healthcare Professions Division
 Health Strategies Division
 Tobacco Prevention Fund
 Evaluation and Research Service
 Public Health Directorate:
 National Prevention Programmes Division
 Communicable Diseases Division
 Biomedicine Division
 Consumer Protection Directorate:
 Radiation Protection Division
 Chemical Products Division
 Notification Authority for chemicals
 Communication and Campaigns Division
 Management Services Division
 International Affairs Division
 Legal Affairs Division
 Resource Management Division

See also 
 COVID-19 pandemic in Switzerland

References

External links 

 

Federal Department of Home Affairs
Public health
Government health agencies
Medical and health organisations based in Switzerland